Coeymans-Bronck Stone House is a historic home located at Coeymans in Albany County, New York.  It was built in 1769 and is a -story, rectangular, rubblestone dwelling topped by a gambrel roof. A modern -story wing is attached to the south elevation. The entry features a broad, finely paneled Georgian-style split (or Dutch) door.

It was listed on the National Register of Historic Places in 2003.

References

External links

Houses on the National Register of Historic Places in New York (state)
Historic American Buildings Survey in New York (state)
Georgian architecture in New York (state)
Houses completed in 1769
Houses in Albany County, New York
National Register of Historic Places in Albany County, New York